Wouter Spoelman (born 5 June 1990) is a Dutch chess grandmaster.

Chess career
Born in 1990, Spoelman earned his international master title in 2006 and his grandmaster title in 2009. He is the No. 12 ranked Dutch player as of March 2018.

References

External links

1990 births
Living people
Chess grandmasters
Dutch chess players
Sportspeople from Zwolle